Sayed Mersal (22 January 1937 – March 2022) was an Egyptian boxer. He competed in the men's light heavyweight event at the 1964 Summer Olympics. At the 1964 Summer Olympics, he defeated Thomas Arimi of Ghana, before losing to Alexander Nikolov of Bulgaria.

References

External links
 

1937 births
2022 deaths
Egyptian male boxers
Olympic boxers of Egypt
Boxers at the 1964 Summer Olympics
Place of birth missing
Light-heavyweight boxers